These are the Kowloon West results of the 2000 Hong Kong legislative election. The election was held on 10 September 2000 and all 4 seats in Kowloon West where consisted of Yau Tsim Mong District, Sham Shui Po District and Kowloon City District were contested. All three incumbents were re-elected, with Frederick Fung regained a seat for the Association for Democracy and People's Livelihood.

Overall results
Before election:

Change in composition:

Candidates list

See also
Legislative Council of Hong Kong
Hong Kong legislative elections
2000 Hong Kong legislative election

References

2000 Hong Kong legislative election